refers to an area surrounding Shinagawa, Tokyo, Japan.

External links

Geography of Tokyo
Shinagawa
Tokyo Bay
Redeveloped ports and waterfronts in Japan